Mukta Tilak (17 August 1965 – 22 December 2022) was an Indian politician. She was elected to the Maharashtra Legislative Assembly from Kasba Peth in the 2019 state elections as a member of Bharatiya Janata Party.

Tilak was elected Mayor of Pune for the period 2017 to 2019. Tilak was the first member of the BJP to hold the Mayor's position. She died due to cancer in Pune on 22nd December 2022.

Personal life and death 
Mukta Tilak was the daughter-in-law (niece-in-law) of Jayantrao Tilak, who was Bal Gangadhar Tilak's grandson. Her husband Shailesh Tilak is also associated with BJP. 

Tilak died of cancer on 22 December 2022, at the age of 57. Her death was condoled by Indian Prime Minister Narendra Modi.

References 

1965 births
2022 deaths 
Deaths from cancer in India
Bharatiya Janata Party politicians from Maharashtra
People from Pune
Maharashtra MLAs 2019–2024
Mayors of Pune
21st-century Indian women politicians
Women members of the Maharashtra Legislative Assembly